Uchiko may refer to:
 Uchiko, sushi restaurant in Austin, Texas, United States
 Uchiko, Ehime, town in Kita District, Ehime, Japan